Old Bridge Airport  is a public-use airport located five nautical miles (9.26 km) south of the central business district of the township of Old Bridge Township in Middlesex County, New Jersey, United States. The airport is privately owned.  The airport is located next to Old Bridge Township Raceway Park.  There is 100LL fuel on the field.

References

External links
 Website: https://www.oldbridgeairport.com/

Airports in New Jersey
Transportation buildings and structures in Middlesex County, New Jersey
Old Bridge Township, New Jersey